Jeremias IV was the Ecumenical Patriarch of Constantinople during the period 1809–1813.

He came from Crete. He became protosyncellus of the Ecumenical Patriarchate and was later elected metropolitan bishop of Mytilene (1783–1809). In 1809, he was elected Ecumenical Patriarch of Constantinople.

Even though of average education, he is considered a successful Patriarch, as he was prudent with remarkable administrative skills. He was also characterised as a remarkably brave protector of the interests of the church. In 1813, he resigned for health reasons. He retired to Mytilene, where he died in 1824.

Sources 
 Ecumenical Patriarchate

1824 deaths
19th-century Ecumenical Patriarchs of Constantinople
Religious leaders from Crete
Year of birth missing